Terry Wade (born February 27, 1960) is an American bodysurfer.

Career 
Wade mastered the largest waves ridden at The Wedge, a surf spot in Newport Beach, California. He received significant media coverage between 1973 and 1998, for sitting in the water for hours waiting for the largest waves of the day. He was described by Details magazine as the "Michael Jordan of big wave bodysurfing".

Wade was among those who fought Newport Beach City Council to keep surf and body boards out of The Wedge during certain times of the day during a specified time of the year, for safety reason. He has also opposed big name surfers bringing large crews of photographers for photo opportunities at The Wedge, and gave an open invitation to all to bodysurf The Wedge.

Media appearances 
Wade has been profiled in many surf magazines, and has appeared in surf films including Thump, Bud Brown's Goin Surfin', Wavemasters, Five Summer Stories, and a documentary by Tom Lynch about The Wedge. For some years after he stopped surfing The Wedge, Wade continued to be interviewed by magazines such as Outside and Details.

In 2016, Wade featured prominently in Dirty Old Wedge, a documentary about the history of The Wedge, and was described as the "superstar" of The Wedge Crew.

Personal life 
Terry has been with his wife, Mellissa, since 1991. They were married in Maui, Hawaii, in 1993.

Like many surfers at The Wedge, Wade has suffered serious health consequences in relation to the sport, including a broken back, a broken nose, ribs, a torn rotator cuff, melanoma and non-Hodgkin's lymphoma.

References 

 Duane, Daniel (August 2004). "The Lip Comes Down", Outside magazine, part 3.
 Warshaw, Matt., The Encyclopedia of Surfing. Orlando: Harvest Book Harcourt, Inc., 2003.
 Details Magazine [United States] (April 2003)

External links
 Greg Deets - A Natural Water Brother at AllAboutSurf.com
 "Dirty Old Wedge" 2016, Director: Burnham, Tim

1960 births
Living people
American surfers
Sportspeople from California